Agonopterix graecella is a moth of the family Depressariidae. It is found in Greece and Italy.

References

Moths described in 1976
Agonopterix
Moths of Europe